Árni Þorláksson (1237 – 17 April 1298;;) was an Icelandic Roman Catholic clergyman, who became the tenth bishop of Iceland (1269–1298).

He served in the diocese of Skálholt. Árni had orders from his superior in Norway to take control of local church property away from secular chieftains. He was largely successful in this.

See also
List of Skálholt bishops

References

13th-century Roman Catholic bishops in Iceland
Thorlaksson, Arni
Thorlaksson, Arni